Virbia metazonata is a moth in the family Erebidae. It was described by George Hampson in 1901. It is found in Panama and Colombia.

References

Moths described in 1901
metazonata